This article is an incomplete outline of terrorist incidents in Afghanistan in 2022 in chronological order.

January–March 
 22 January - Herat bus bombing
 4 March - Islamic State – Khorasan Province detonates a bomb in a mosque in Paktia Province, killing three people and injuring at least 24.

April–June 
 19 April - April 2022 Kabul school bombing
 21 April - 2022 Mazar-i-Sharif mosque bombing
 22 April - 2022 Kunduz mosque bombing
 28 April - 28 April 2022 Mazar-i-Sharif bombings
 29 April - April 2022 Kabul mosque bombing
 25 May :
 May 2022 Kabul mosque bombing
 2022 Mazar-i-Sharif minivan bombings

July–September 
 5 August - 5 August 2022 Kabul bombing
 17 August - August 2022 Kabul mosque bombing
 5 September - Bombing of the Russian embassy in Kabul
 23 September - September 2022 Kabul mosque bombing
 30 September - September 2022 Kabul school bombing

October–December 
 30 November - 2022 Aybak bombing
 6 December - December 2022 Mazar-i-Sharif bombing
 12 December - 2022 Kabul hotel attack

See also 
List of 2021 Afghanistan attacks

References